This is a list of the 149 members of the 50th Parliament of Haiti. The Chamber of Deputies is currently defunct  as the terms of the representatives elected in the 2015–16 election expired. 10 senators elected in 2016–17 retained their seats until 10 January 2023, and after the expiration of these remaining senators' terms, Haiti has no elected members of either chamber of its Parliament.

Senate

Artibonite

Centre

Grand'Anse

Nippes

Nord

Nord-Est

Nord-Ouest

Ouest

Sud

Sud-Est

Chamber of Deputies

Artibonite

Centre

Grand'Anse

Nippes

Nord

Nord-Est

Nord-Ouest

Ouest

Sud

Sud-Est

References

External links 
 
 Source of data for both senate and chamber of Deputies

Haiti
 
Parliament of Haiti, list of current members of